South Texas Academy for Medical Professions, also known as Medical Academy, is a high school in San Benito, Texas, United States.

The school was opened in 2003 as South Texas Academy of Medical Technology in San Benito and changed its name in 2012 to South Texas Academy for Medical Professions(Medical Academy). The school relocated to Olmito, Texas to its bigger campus which opened in 2015. The school serves as an alternative to larger high schools of local independent school districts for students interested in pursuing careers in health care. South Texas Academy for Medical Professions is part of the South Texas Independent School District. It has notable partnerships with Baylor College of Medicine, Harlingen Medical Center, Regional Academic Health Center, Texas State Technical College, Valley Baptist Medical Center and University of Texas at Brownsville.

References

External links
 

South Texas Independent School District high schools
Schools in Cameron County, Texas
Public high schools in Texas